Sarbeswar Sahariah is an Indian nephrologist and organ transplant specialist, known for his expertise in renal and pancreatic transplantation. He was honoured by the Government of India, in 2014, by bestowing on him the Padma Shri, the fourth highest civilian award, for his contributions to the field of medicine. Sahariah is credited with more than 3000 renal transplantations, which many consider, has made him the most prolific kidney transplant surgeon in the country.

Biography
Sarbeswar Sahariah was born in a family with meagre financial resources, at Mangaldai on Tengabari Road, a hilly village in the district of Darrang, in the Himalayan state of Assam, India, on 1 April 1945. He did his early schooling at a local school and passed his higher secondary examinations from the Government High School in Mangaldai, in 1962, with the highest marks in the state for Biology. Opting for the medical career, he joined Medical College in Guwahati, on financial assistance for the State Government, meant for economically backward classes and passed MBBS in 1967, from the Gauhati University, standing fourth overall in the examinations. Subsequently, he did the mandatory house surgeoncy at the Safdarjung Hospital, New Delhi, which he completed in 1970. He, then, moved to Chandigarh and worked at the Post Graduate Institute of Medical Education and Research (PGIMER), Chandigarh as a resident, while pursuing the master's degree,  passed MS with a bronze medal in 1973 and continued there to complete the senior residency in 1976. While at PGIMER, he had the opportunity to be involved with the first successful renal transplantation, in 1973.

Saharaiah started his career as a Pool Officer under the Council of Scientific and Industrial Research programme at the Renal Transplantation department of PGIMER, in 1976. Later, in 1978, he joined the faculty of PGIMER and worked there till 1981. The next move was to the Organ Transplantation Centre, Institute of Genetics and Hospital for Genetic Diseases, Hyderabad, as the Head of the Centre as the Reader and Chief Renal Transplant Surgeon, in 1981, and continued there till 1985. It was here, he performed the first renal transplantation in Hyderabad which is in current State of Telangana, in 1981. Saharaiah resigned from the Government service in 1985 and has since been practicing at various hospitals in the country.

Sahariah lives at Jubilee Hills, an upmarket residential neighbourhood in west Hyderabad, in the present day Telangana state, India, attending to his duties at the Krishna Institute of Medical Sciences in the city, with his wife and two children, a son and a daughter.

Achievements and legacy

Saharaiah is credited with many firsts. He was associated with the first successful kidney transplantation in India, in 1973, while he was working at the Post Graduate Institute of Medical Education and Research, Chandigarh. This was followed by the first kidney transplantation in Hyderabad, in 1981. The first ten renal transplants in the state of Assam are also credited to him, which he did during the period from 1992 to 2003. He is credited with the first cadaver donor renal transplant in Hyderabad, beginning of a career where he would perform eight more such transplants. It is reported that he has successfully performed renal transplants from 18-month-old cadaver, considered to be the youngest donor in India, and from 78-year-old cadaver, regarded as the oldest donor in the country. He is reported to have performed the first laparoscopic donor nephrectomy in the country, in 1988. He has performed renal transplantations in rural areas, another first credited to him, performed at the rural hospital, Jawaharlal Nehru Medical College, Wardha. The reports say he has done more than 3000 renal transplant operations and over 5000 surgeries for vascular access for haemodialysis.

Sahariah's legacy lives on mainly in Telangana & Andhra Pradesh, where he has put in efforts for the propagation of renal transplantation programme. He was instrumental in initiating the programme across the state, including the Nizam's Institute of Medical Sciences and Gandhi Hospital and Medical College. Medical institutions such as Bollineni Hospital, Nellore, CDR Hospital, Visakhapatnam, Pinnamalani Polyclinic, Vijaywada, Seven Hills Hospital, Visakhapatnam, St. Johns Medical College, Bangalore, M. S. Ramaiah Medical College, Bangalore, Sir Ganga Ram Hospital, New Delhi, Down Town Hospital, Guwahati, Damani Hospital, Dibrugarh, Gauhati Medical College and Hospital, J. N. Medical College Hospital, Maharashtra, Suretech Hospital, Nagpur, Orange City Hospital, Nagpur, Hi-tech Medical College Hospital, Bhubaneswar, Kalinga Hospital, Bhubaneswar, and International Hospital have all sought Saharaiah's assistance in setting up the renal programme. He has also strived to spread the message in Assam with a programme by which people from economically poor backgrounds can receive renal transplants at a charity hospital in Hyderabad, the Mahavir Hospital and Research Centre. He has founded a charitable organization, North East Care Foundation, which runs a free medical clinic in Guwahati. The clinic gives free medical consultation and supplies free drugs to patients in the region.

Research
Sahariah has done research on organ transplantation. After undergoing training in Experimental Transplantation and Transplantation Immunology at the School of Medicine, Tokai University, Japan, under Professor K. Tanuji he carried on with his research on the topic. He has also participated in the International Transplant Observership programme at the Massachusetts General Hospital, Boston, USA in 2009. Sahariah is also credited with developing new techniques in islet and segmental pancreatic transplantation. He has published his findings in many peer reviewed journals.

Awards and recognitions
The Government of India, in 2014, honoured Sahariah, by awarding him the civilian honour of Padma Shri. He has also received many other awards and recognitions such as:
 MAMS - Membership of the National Academy of Medical Sciences,  New Delhi - 1979
 FICS - Fellowship of the International College of Surgeons
 FACS - Fellowship of the American College of Surgeons - 1983
 Dr. Brahmaiah Sastry Memorial Oration Award - Andhra Medical College, Visakhapatnam - 2011
 Dr. R. V. S. Yadav Memorial Oration Award - Indian Society of Organ Transplantation, Ludhiana - 2008

Jawaharlal Nehru Medical College, Wardha, Maharashtra, in 2000, honoured Sahariah by appointing him as the Professor Emeritus.

Publications
Saharaiah has written a book, My Journey with Kidney Transplantation describing his life experiences during 1974 - 2004 period. The book was released at a felicitation function organized by the Indian Medical Association, Assam chapter. He has published several research papers in peer reviewed journals. A random selection of his articles reads as:

References

1945 births
Living people
Recipients of the Padma Shri in medicine
20th-century Indian medical doctors
People from Darrang district
Indian medical researchers
Indian nephrologists
Medical doctors from Assam
Postgraduate Institute of Medical Education and Research alumni